Guibourtia coleosperma, the African rosewood (ambiguous), large false mopane, Rhodesian copalwood or machibi, is a species of Guibourtia in the family Fabaceae. It is a large evergreen tree (to 20 m tall) found in open woodland and dry forest, almost exclusively on Kalahari Sand in Angola, southern Democratic Republic of Congo, Namibia, Botswana, Zambia, and Zimbabwe.

The condensed tannins proguibourtinidins can be found in G. coleosperma. G. coleosperma timber has a noticeable smell of menthol.

See also
 List of Southern African indigenous trees and woody lianes

References

External links

coleosperma
Trees of Africa
Trees of Angola
Trees of Botswana
Trees of the Democratic Republic of the Congo